Consultant Plus is an assistance system to work with the legislation of Russia.  Consultant's centralized database is updated daily.  It is distributed via a network of partners.

Its major competitors are Garant and Codex and Techexpert, both proprietary.

The full federal law database includes over 3 million documents; regional acts are distributed in a separate database with over 4 million documents.

The information contained in the system is structured into several notions, including:
 legislation
 jurisprudence
 financial advice
 legislation commentaries
 document forms (templates)
 legislation drafts
 international legal acts
 health protection legal acts
 technical standards and rules

Every class mentioned above consists of several information banks to simplify the search throughout the database by manually excluding the classes and banks inappropriate for each current search.

The database includes:
 normative legal acts of Russia and its federal subjects, as well as international
 commentaries and explanations for them, precedents from the common practice
 articles and books from periodicals and text collections
 forms of account correspondence
 forms of the documents (officially standardized and approximate)
 other helpful information (accountant calendar, exchange rates, bank rate, etc.)
 analytical reports

External links
 Official site of Consultant Plus 
 Artiks - Consultant Plus information center web-site 
 Internet-based version of ConsultantPlus 
 Non-commercial projects of ConsultantPlus (for schools, universities, etc.) 
 Consultant Plus app for Android 

Legal software
Law of Russia
Windows-only software
Law databases
Databases in Russia